Esek Bussey Firehouse, now known as Engine Company 8 or Pumper Number 8, is a historic fire station located at Troy in Rensselaer County, New York.  It was built in 1891-1892 and is a two-story, red brick building.  It features a corbeled brick frieze, flat roof, rusticated stone work, and terra cotta detailing.

It was listed on the National Register of Historic Places in 1973.

References

Fire stations on the National Register of Historic Places in New York (state)
Fire stations completed in 1892
Buildings and structures in Rensselaer County, New York
National Register of Historic Places in Troy, New York